Langia zenzeroides, the apple hawkmoth, is a moth of the family Sphingidae. It was described by Frederic Moore in 1872.

Distribution 
It is found in northern India, eastern and southern China, South Korea, northern Thailand, northern Vietnam, Japan and Taiwan.

Description 
The wingspan is 100–156 mm.

Biology 
In northern China, there is one generation per year, with adults on wing from April to May. In Korea, adults have been recorded from late April to mid-May and in Thailand, the main flight period is January and February.

The larvae have been recorded on Prunus persica, but feed on most woody Rosaceae species, such as cherries, apples, pears and medlars.

Subspecies
Langia zenzeroides zenzeroides (northern India, eastern and southern China, South Korea, northern Thailand and northern Vietnam)
Langia zenzeroides nawai Rothschild & Jordan, 1903 (Japan)
Langia zenzeroides formosana Clark, 1936 (mountains of Taiwan)

References

Smerinthini
Moths described in 1872
Moths of Japan
Taxa named by Frederic Moore